Feel Something is the debut studio album by Movements. It peaked at 21 on the US Alternative Albums chart and 191 on the Billboard 200.

Reception 

Feel Something received critical acclaim. Depth Mag named the album one of the stand out albums of 2017.

Commercial performance
The album made #2 on the Billboard's Top New Artist Albums Chart and peaked at #190 on the Billboard 200.

Track listing

Personnel
Patrick Miranda - lead vocals
Ira George - lead guitar
Austin Cressey - bass guitar and rhythm guitar
Spencer York - drums, percussion

Charts

References

External links

Feel Something at YouTube (streamed copy where licensed)

2017 albums
Movements (band) albums
Fearless Records albums
Albums produced by Will Yip